Gideon Gardner (May 30, 1759 – March 22, 1832) was a U.S. Representative from Massachusetts.

Born in Nantucket in the Province of Massachusetts Bay, Gardner received a limited schooling.
Gardner was a successful ship master, and later became a shipowner.
Gardner also engaged in mercantile pursuits. He was reportedly owner of the Ganges (1809 whaler) when "Gardner's Island" was discovered.

Gardner was elected as a Democratic-Republican Party to the Eleventh Congress (March 4, 1809 – March 3, 1811).
He resumed his former business pursuits.
He was the bearer of a petition from the citizens of Nantucket to Congress for tax relief in 1813.
He died in Nantucket, Massachusetts, March 22, 1832.
He was interred in Friends Burying Ground.

Gardner was a direct descendant of Thomas Gardner (planter).

See also
 Gardner (whaling family)

References

1759 births
1832 deaths
Democratic-Republican Party members of the United States House of Representatives from Massachusetts